The following lists events that happened during 1808 in Australia.

Incumbents
Monarch - George III

Governors
Governors of the Australian colonies:
Governor of New South Wales – Captain William Bligh (until 26 January by no coincidence), then Major George Johnston (until 28 July), then Major Joseph Foveaux
Lieutenant-Governor of Southern Van Diemen's Land – David Collins
Lieutenant-Governor of Northern Van Diemen's Land – William Paterson (until 24 March)

Events
26 January – John Macarthur is arrested sparking the Rum Rebellion. Military officers supporting Macarthur arrest Governor Bligh.
2 February – William Paterson sails to Sydney from Port Dalrymple, Van Diemen's Land to take over the administration of New South Wales following the removal of Bligh.

Exploration and settlement
 First settlement at Kingston, Van Diemen's Land.

Births
23 September – William Henty, one of the Henty brothers (although the only brother not to set foot in Portland, Victoria): he took a leading part in the legal disputes over the settlement.

Deaths
19 June – Alexander Dalrymple, who had strongly opposed the establishment of New South Wales in A Serious Admonition to the Public on the Intended Thief-Colony at Botany Bay (London, 1786).
3 September – Philip Gidley King, third Governor of New South Wales.

References

 
Australia
Years of the 19th century in Australia